Commissioner's Trophy may refer to:

 Commissioner's Trophy (MLB), awarded to the champions of Major League Baseball
 Commissioner's Trophy (IHL), awarded to the International Hockey League's coach of the year between 1985 and 2001

See also
Major League Baseball All-Star Game Most Valuable Player Award, formerly known as the Commissioner's Trophy
Commissioner's Historic Achievement Award